The 1962 Wyoming Cowboys football team was an American football team that represented the University of Wyoming as a member oof the Western Athletic Conference (WAC) during the 1962 NCAA University Division football season.  In their first season under head coach Lloyd Eaton, the Cowboys compiled a 5–5 record (2–2 against conference opponents), tied for third in the WAC, and outscored opponents by a total of 165 to 143.

Schedule

References

Wyoming
Wyoming Cowboys football seasons
Wyoming Cowboys football